Since 1994, the Albert B. Sabin Gold Medal has been awarded annually by the Sabin Vaccine Institute in recognition of work in the field of vaccinology or a complementary field. It is in commemoration of the pioneering work of Albert B. Sabin.

Recipients

See also

 List of medicine awards

References

External links
Sabin Vaccine Institute

Medicine awards